Burtinle District is a district in the northeastern Nugal region of Somalia. Its capital is Burtinle.

References

External links
 Districts of Somalia
 Administrative map of Burtinle District

Districts of Somalia

Nugal, Somalia